Biorhythm may refer to:

 Biorhythm (pseudoscience), developed by Wilhelm Fliess in the 19th Century
 Biological rhythm, repetitive cycles that occur in biology, studied in the science of chronobiology

See also
 Chronobiology